Mount Wright is a  mountain located in the eastern Alaskan panhandle, on the east side of Muir Inlet, just north of Glacier Bay within Glacier Bay National Park and Preserve.

Location

History
Mount Wright was named by Dr. Harry Fielding Reid in 1891 after George Frederick Wright who spent some time in the Glacier Bay area in 1886. Forty-three miles to the west is another mountain also called Mount Wright.

Climate

Based on the Köppen climate classification, Mount Wright has a subarctic climate (Dfc) with cold, snowy winters, and mild summers. Temperatures can drop below −20 °C with wind chill factors below −30 °C. Precipitation runoff from the mountain drains into Glacier Bay Basin.

Fauna
The area has a high population of mountain goats.

References

External links
 Weather forecast: Mount Wright

Mountains of Glacier Bay National Park and Preserve
Mountains of Unorganized Borough, Alaska
Saint Elias Mountains
Landforms of Hoonah–Angoon Census Area, Alaska